That's may refer to:

 "That's", a brand name used on recordable media by Taiyo Yuden and its subsidiary That's Fukushima Co., Ltd.
 Several English-language listings magazines in the People's Republic of China
That's Beijing
That's Shanghai
That's PRD
That's Shenzhen